Spirulina abbreviata  is a marine cyanobacteria from the genus Spirulina.

References

Further reading 
 

 

Spirulinales
Bacteria described in 1895